Li Shiu Tong (9 January 1907 – 5 October 1993) was a Chinese-Canadian medical student, sexologist, and LGBTQ activist in the early twentieth century, known as the secret boyfriend of German sexologist Magnus Hirschfeld.

Early life 
Li Shiu Tong  was born in Hong Kong under British rule to Li Kam-tong, a wealthy Chinese businessman in British Hong Kong. He was also the grandson of Li Hongzhang, the Qing politician and reformer. He went to St. John's University, Shanghai to study medicine, but dropped out in 1931 in order to pursue studying sexology with Magnus Hirschfield, who served as his teacher, mentor, and lover.

Early career and world tour 
Li met Hirschfeld at a public lecture for Chinese feminists at China United Apartments in 1931. Li recalled that "His lecture[s] [were] about human sexual variation[,] particularly on homosexuality[,] a still ignorant and controversial topic." After the lecture, Li approached Hirschfeld. Hirschfeld claimed "He [Li] offered himself to me, after my first lecture in Shanghai, as a ‘companion’ and ‘protector,’ to take care of me and help me wherever I might want to travel in China, in particular to stand by my side as a Chinese interpreter." His father approved of their relationship and hoped that his son would become "the Hirschfeld of China". Hirschfeld nicknamed him "Tao Li" (also spelled Taoli; ; ; also a reference to the usage of peaches as symbolism for homosexuality in Chinese culture), a name that he would be known as by others in their circles. Li ended up translating for Hirschfeld in a meeting with the Minister of Health of Kuomintang about "prostitution, birth control, and homosexuality."

Li quit medical school soon after at the age of 24 in order to pursue a career with Hirschfeld, which he hoped would end in him being able to study at a European University. Li seems to be criminally underrepresented when talking about sexology and the world tour he and Hirschfeld went on. Li never had his political opinions explicitly expressed, however there were repeated references to the opinions of "Chinese students" on imperialism, which probably was in reference to Li as there were not a lot of meetings with Chinese students. There were many instances of racism against Li throughout the world tour. For instance, Li wasn't allowed to leave the ship to enter American-occupied Manila until he got special clearance because of the Immigration Act of 1924 and the Chinese Exclusion Act. He and Hirschfeld ended up returning to Europe 17 March 1932 in Athens. The original plan was to return to Berlin so Li could finish medical school and work at the Institute of Sexual Science, but this was derailed by the rising influence of the Nazi Party in Germany. Here they met Hirschfeld's other lover, Karl Giese. According to Giese, they got along well, and described Li as "very nice and chummy to me," but an acquaintance of Hirschfeld said "He’s living now with both flames (Tao and Karl). And the best part is, both of them are soooo jealous about the old geezer. Now if that’s not true love?!." Li and Hirschfeld spent many years in exile, with Li acting as Hirschfeld's secretary. They spent some years apart with Li going to the University of Vienna to study medicine while Hirschfeld lived in neutral Switzerland. During this exile, Li gave a paper with both his and Hirschfeld's name on it to the Congress of the World League for Sexual Reform in Brno, Czechoslovakia. This paper was one of the first papers written that extensively cover intersex people as well as the idea that homosexuality was not a disease, but rather natural human variation influenced by disposition and environment. Before Magnus died, Li studied at the University of Zurich. Robert Hichens would write a novel about Hirschfeld and Li's life in France during the former's last years titled That Which is Hidden, which was published in 1939.

Life after Magnus 
Li and Giese were named the primary heirs in Hirschfeld's will, in which he stipulated that he would give Li inheritance in order to carry on Magnus' legacy. According to Giese, "Tao is rather panicky...Apart from the personal loss, the responsibilities that Papa has sort of imposed [quasi auferlegt] on him are a bit oppressive in light of his youth ... It is an inheritance just as honorable as it is obligatory, obligatory to the greatest possible extent, such that Tao does not even know whether he should accept it." Li ended up accepting the task at 28 with no medical degree, no papers in his name alone, and no backing from the now destroyed Institute of Sexual Science. However, he was unable to do so, and he entered a "drifting" period after Hirschfeld's death, where he used family money to travel across Europe and North America and study at numerous universities, including Harvard, without actually completing a degree program or taking any examinations. He then moved back to Hong Kong in 1958 before settling in Canada for the final phase of his life in 1975. Throughout his journeys, he had kept Hirschfeld's personal items that he had inherited.

Sexology 
Li started his manuscript on a new theory of sexology in the 1980s, which seemed to only be partially finished at 16 pages. It also appears to have parts missing that were not taken from the garbage and presumably live in Vancouver's Delta Landfill. The manuscript includes presumably Li's first book "The Institute of S. Science in Berlin/Long introduction/Story (mixed with science) the whole book," which seems to be an account of sexological research combined with a psychological thriller about escaping Germany, which is partially fiction based on Li and Hirschfeld's escape. The book depicts Li's time evading the German authorities, who were after records of "the sexual behaviors of foreign patients" in order to gain access to blackmail material about foreign officials’ sexual behavior. Li interspersed his many adventures post-Hirschfeld with his findings. He mentions nothing of his love affair with Hirschfeld. Li wrote a lot about how he did not view gender as absolute, but a continuum, and argued that sexual minorities are natural. However, he broke from common beliefs with his claims that "A homosexual is not born but made" and asserts that homosexuality is nature's defense against overpopulation. He also believed that there were a lot of transgender people, who he claimed were "the most interesting manki[n]d. A complex sexual of mankind. Dr. [Hirschfeld] was the best authority of this subject in fact he discovered it. The behavior of transvertit put some explanation on homosexual, bisexual, and even on heterosexual." He also claimed that queerness was a lot more common than people thought, claiming "humans were 40 percent bisexual, 30 percent heterosexual, 20 percent homosexual, and 10 percent other." The key difference that distinguished him from Hirschfeld was that Li did not entirely throw out the idea that queerness in sexuality and gender can be affected by environment, which is a departure of the claims by Hirschfeld that they were only due to biology and were a natural response to overpopulation.

Death and legacy 
Li Shiu Tong died on 5 October 1993, in St. Paul's Hospital, Vancouver, Canada at the age of 86. Li's brother presumably dealt with his affairs, and many of his manuscripts and belongings ended up in a dumpster near his apartment. A neighbor recovered "an old German passport from the 1930s, black-and-white photographs, papers, a little journal filled with a scrawling hand, a few letters, many copies of a French magazine called , and… Hirschfeld’s death mask." Ralf Dose, who wrote Magnus Hirschfeld: The Origins of the Gay Liberation Movement, came across a listing for the items 8 years later, and obtained these items along with Li's books from his brother, who claimed he kept the books because Li had risked his life to save them from Nazi Germany. Unfortunately, most of the manuscript probably resides in the Delta landfill.

References 

1907 births
1993 deaths
Canadian LGBT rights activists
St. John's University, Shanghai alumni
Hong Kong emigrants to Canada
Hong Kong gay men